Republics Now is an electoral alliance formed for the 2019 European Parliament election in Spain by Republican Left of Catalonia (ERC), Basque Country Gather (EH Bildu) and Galician Nationalist Bloc (BNG) and with Oriol Junqueras as its leading candidate. The second candidate of the list will be Diana Riba (wife of Raül Romeva, also imprisoned). The following candidates on the list will be shared between EH Bildu, BNG and ERC. Moreover, Andecha Astur, Puyalón de Cuchas, Canarian Nationalist Alternative, National Congress of the Canaries and Unity of the People will also participate in the candidature. It is a successor to The Left for the Right to Decide and The Peoples Decide coalitions in the 2014 election. ERC said that the alliance is open to other "Souverainist, republican and progressive forces".

Composition

Electoral performance

European Parliament

References

 
Regionalist parties in Spain
Nationalist parties in Spain
Republican parties in Spain
2019 establishments in Spain
Political parties established in 2019
Socialist parties in Spain